Nicholas Ivan Maximov (born December 23, 1997) is an Russian-American mixed martial artist who competed in the Middleweight division of the Ultimate Fighting Championship.

Background
Starting out with karate and taekwondo at the age of 11, he then took on jiu-jitsu. Maximov wrestled while in high school, having a very successful run on the Chico High wrestling team, with 137 wins against 37 losses. He would continue wrestling while attending college, first  wrestling for Clackamas Community College and, briefly, at Oregon State, earning All-American honors during his second season at Clackamas Community College.

Through an introduction through his father being friends with a training partner of the Diaz brothers, Nick started training at Nate Diaz Academy in Stockton.

Mixed martial arts career

Early career
Making his MMA professional debut at KOTC Terminal Velocity, he defeated Nick Piecuch via TKO in the first round, followed by a second round kimura at Hard Fought Championships 1 against Bruno Casillas. He would go on to defeat William Hope via TKO in round one at Iron Pit Promotions High Desert Brawl 14, before picking up a rear-naked submission in the first round at KOTC Return to Order.

Maximov faced Johnny James Jr. at LFA 91. He won the bout via rear-naked choke in the second round.

Maximov was scheduled to face Matheus Scheffel in a Light Heavyweight bout at Dana White's Contender Series 36 on November 17, 2020. However, Scheffel pulled out of the bout and was scheduled at Heavyweight against Oscar Cota, who also had his opponent pul out. He won the fight via unanimous decision, however wasn't awarded a UFC contract.

Ultimate Fighting Championship
In June 2021, it was announced that Maximov had signed with the UFC.

Maximov was scheduled to make his UFC debut against Karl Roberson on September 25, 2021 at UFC 266. However, due to medical issues Roberson was forced to withdraw from the event and he was replaced by promotional newcomer Cody Brundage. Maximov won his debut via unanimous decision.

In his sophomore performance, Maximov faced Punahele Soriano on February 5, 2022 at UFC Fight Night 200. He won the fight via split decision. 12 out of 16 media scores gave it to Maximov.

Maximov faced Andre Petroski at UFC on ESPN: Błachowicz vs. Rakić on May 14, 2022. Maximov lost the bout after getting choked out in the first round via an anaconda choke submission.

Maximov faced  Jacob Malkoun on October 15, 2022, at UFC Fight Night 212. He lost the fight via unanimous decision.

In late October 2022, it was reported that Maximov was released by UFC.

Mixed martial arts record

|-
|Loss
|align=center|8–2
|Jacob Malkoun
|Decision (unanimous)
|UFC Fight Night: Grasso vs. Araújo
|
|align=center|3
|align=center|5:00
|Las Vegas, Nevada, United States
|
|-
|Loss
|align=center|8–1
|Andre Petroski
|Technical Submission (anaconda choke)
|UFC on ESPN: Błachowicz vs. Rakić
|
|align=center|1
|align=center|1:16
|Las Vegas, Nevada, United States
| 
|-
|Win
|align=center|8–0
|Punahele Soriano
|Decision (split)
|UFC Fight Night: Hermansson vs. Strickland
| 
|align=center|3
|align=center|5:00
|Las Vegas, Nevada, United States
|
|-
|Win
|align=center|7–0
|Cody Brundage
|Decision (unanimous)
|UFC 266
|
|align=center|3
|align=center|5:00
|Las Vegas, Nevada, United States
|
|-
|Win
|align=center|6–0
|Oscar Cota
|Decision (unanimous)
|Dana White's Contender Series 36
|
|align=center|3
|align=center|5:00
|Las Vegas, Nevada, United States
|
|-
|Win
|align=center|5–0
|Johnny James Jr.
|Submission (rear-naked choke)
|LFA 91
|
|align=center|2
|align=center|4:01
|Sioux Falls, South Dakota, United States
| 
|-
|Win
|align=center|4–0
|Robert Allensworth
|Submission (rear-naked choke)
|KOTC: Return to Order
|
|align=center|1
|align=center|1:37
|Oroville, California, United States
|
|-
|Win
|align=center|3–0
|William Hope
|TKO (punches)
|High Desert Brawl 14
|
|align=center|1
|align=center|1:35
|Susanville, California, United States
|
|-
|Win
|align=center|2–0
|Bruno Casillas
|Submission (kimura)
|Hard Fought Championship 1
|
|align=center|2
|align=center|3:44
|Redding, California, United States
|
|-
|Win
|align=center|1–0
|Nick Piecuch
|TKO (punches)
|KOTC: Terminal Velocity
|
|align=center|1
|align=center|0:23
|Oroville, California, United States
|

See also 
 List of male mixed martial artists

References

External links 
  
 

1997 births
Living people
American male mixed martial artists
Middleweight mixed martial artists
Mixed martial artists utilizing karate
Mixed martial artists utilizing taekwondo
Mixed martial artists utilizing collegiate wrestling
Mixed martial artists utilizing Brazilian jiu-jitsu
Ultimate Fighting Championship male fighters
American male karateka
American male taekwondo practitioners
American male sport wrestlers
Amateur wrestlers
American practitioners of Brazilian jiu-jitsu